Quattroruote (English: Four Wheels) is an Italian automobile magazine established by the Marchigian entrepreneur Gianni Mazzocchi in February 1956. Among its regular features it includes information on used car prices.

History and profile
Quattroruote was established by  Gianni Mazzocchi in 1956. The publisher of the magazine is Editoriale Domus. Its head office is in Rozzano (Milan Province), where the historical museum of the magazine is located. The magazine is published monthly and offers news on road and track tests, price lists for new cars as well as quotations for used vehicles.

The magazine is also published in various countries, including China and Russia which was launched in 2006.

Circulation
Quattroruote had a circulation of 596,742 copies between September 1993 and August 1994. The circulation of the magazine was 464,000 copies in 2004. Between February 2006 and January 2007 the magazine sold 450,500 copies. It was the first best-selling automobile magazine in Italy in 2007 with a circulation of 425,539 copies. The magazine had a circulation of 354,735 copies in 2010, making it the fourth best-selling European automobile magazine and the absolute best selling in Italy.

The Automotive Safety Centre
The test-track belonging to the magazine is  located in Vairano di Vidigulfo (Pavia Province). The Automotive Safety Centre, opened in 1995, is 4500 m long, with an 1800 m main straight, where acceleration tests are carried out. During these tests it is possible to reach 300 km/h. The race track has been approved by FIA for Formula One tests.

The handling track
The handling track, connected to the speed test area and used for handling test of vehicles, has bends and chicanes of different radii where oversteer and understeer of vehicles can be examined.

SUV test area
The SUV test area is next to the ASC straight section, where off-road vehicle driving and overturning characteristics are established.

Safe drive
Quattroruote organizes safe driving courses on an area of about 17000 m² where students, followed by expert instructors, are taught driving techniques on wet or dry surfaces, handling and stopping.

Events

Quattroruote Day

Anniversary of the first issue of the principal magazine, the 2006 (fiftieth) and 2016 (sixtieth) Quattroruote Days are represented by much merchandise and advertising.

TG Cup/GT Cup

For motives of copyrights, from 2015 known as GT Cup, is the official Top Gear Italian festival/race organized by Editoriale Domus. Any year, in the participants list appears The Stig.

Rome Top Gear event

Organised by Editoriale Domus and Quattroruote, and set also in Poland, is an international car exhibition in Rome.

Books
One of the most significant of Quattroruote's book series is the famous Tutte le auto del mondo ("All the cars of the world", sometimes stylized as Tutte le Auto del Mondo) or "TaM", any issue of this series was for sale any year, with the death of its "director" in Lido di Jesolo (in the Province of Venice), this books was not more published.

In 2006, it was published the book Pericolo, attraversamento rane! (Literally: Danger, crossing frogs!), Which collects various photographs related to vehicles and roads, with funny comments.

See also
 List of magazines in Italy

References

External links

 Official website

1956 establishments in Italy
Automobile magazines
Magazines published in Milan
Italian-language magazines
Monthly magazines published in Italy
Magazines established in 1956